The Courier-Times is  a once-a-week newspaper based in Roxboro, North Carolina covering Person County. Publications are on Thursdays. The newspaper publishes several special sections, in January on Taxes,  home improvement in May, local graduates in May, fall sports in August, holiday shopping on Thanksgiving Day, and Christmas greetings on Christmas Day.

In 2017, The Courier-Times was acquired by the owners of The Daily Record in Dunn, North Carolina.

In 2020, then publisher-editor Johnny Whitfield resigned after racist editorial cartoon printed.

Kelly Snow was hired as the publisher and editor in June 2020. Snow served as the C-T's sports editor from 2003 to 2006 and again from January 2012-September 2020.

References

External links

Newspapers published in North Carolina
Person County, North Carolina